Miss Prissy (born Marquisa Gardner) is an American dancer known for the krumping style. She has been called The Queen of Krump.

She was one of the dancers featured in the 2005 film Rize, a documentary about krump dancing. In 2012 she choreographed The Underground, a performance by 12 dancers to celebrate the 10th anniversary of the beginnings of krump, at the University of Southern California's Bovard Auditorium.  Other film appearances include Alvin and the Chipmunks (2007).

Miss Prissy trained in classical ballet from the age of four, and was a cheerleader at school. She began to be called "Miss Prissy" because school-mates in "The Valley" were surprised that a girl from her "South Central" background was a ballet dancer and "so girly".  She teaches krumping at a dance school in North Hollywood.

References

External links

Year of birth missing (living people)
Living people
African-American female dancers
American female dancers
American dancers
African-American dancers
21st-century African-American people
21st-century African-American women